Karl Mayer is a fictional character portrayed by Richard Burgi and created by television producer and screenwriter Marc Cherry for the ABC television series Desperate Housewives. He is the ex-husband of housewife Susan Mayer (Teri Hatcher) and father of Julie Mayer (Andrea Bowen), as well as a successful practitioner of family law. The character also becomes romantically involved in the series with two other housewives, Edie Britt (Nicollette Sheridan) and Bree Van De Kamp (Marcia Cross), both of whom he gets engaged to. Karl dies in Season 6, Episode 11  after injuries sustained when a plane crashes into Wisteria Lane during the Christmas Festival.

Development and casting
According to Cherry, casting the role of Karl was difficult because he "wanted a guy that was nice looking and seemed like he would have been married to Teri, but was also someone you wouldn't like." The character was portrayed by another actor in a series of non-speaking flashbacks in the pilot episode, but the role was recast once the direction of the character changed. After making some guest appearances during the first season, Burgi joined the regular cast in the second season. However, he returned to his guest starring status from the third season until his character's death halfway through the sixth season. Burgi returned for the series finale, appearing as his character's ghost among other deceased characters.

Storylines

Past 
A lawyer by profession, in 1989 he married Susan Bremmer and a year later their daughter, Julie, was born. In 1992, he moved with his wife and daughter to Fairview, 4353 Wisteria Lane. Eleven years later, Karl cheated on Susan with Edie Britt and secretary Brandi Edie passed on information about this second affair to Susan. Subsequently, Susan herself saw the lipstick mark on her husband's shirt. Julie's mother burned down all the bridges that connected her with her husband: sports awards, golf clubs and shoes. The engagement ring from his grandmother had thrown on one of the state road. His wife filed for divorce with the court and kicked him out of the house, changing the locks.

Season 1

In the season one episode "Move On", Karl ends his relationship with Brandi and asks Susan for a second chance, but she declines because of her commitment to Mike Delfino. Susan also discovers that he flirted with Edie while they were married, and soon Karl starts dating Edie.

Season 2
Susan discovers that Karl is now living with Edie. However, he is jealous of Mike and tries twice to get back with Susan. He even goes so far as to lie to Susan and say that he was breaking it off with Edie, which led to him and Susan having sex. It is made obvious that Karl is still in love with Susan, as shown by several pictures of her that he secretly keeps around the house for him to look at from time to time.

Later Bree Van de Kamp hires Karl to stop her son, Andrew Van de Kamp from blackmailing her. Karl tells Andrew that even though Bree did witness George Williams die, she will not even face trial. When an unfazed Andrew threatens to make up stories about Bree or publicly humiliate her, Karl physically threatens Andrew and invokes his friendship with Andrew's late father Rex to get him to back down.

Later in the season, when Susan finds out she needs to have a surgical operation to correct a wandering spleen, Karl offers to marry Susan so that she can use his health insurance to pay for it, but they plan to divorce soon after Susan's surgery. Karl becomes jealous of Susan and Dr. Ron McCready's relationship. Knowing that Susan had not yet mentioned her and Mike's past, Karl breaks open a pipe under the sink, sends Ron out to get Mike, then watches happily as Ron and Mike get into a fight on the street which ends with Ron breaking up with Susan and then driving off.

Later on, Karl asks Edie to marry him; however, when Edie learns of their sham marriage, she demands that Karl propose to her and throw her a lavish wedding. Karl and Susan sleep together one night and, as revenge, Edie burns Susan's house down, prompting Karl to buy her a new one as another attempt to get her back, only to be stopped by Mike. Karl eventually leaves Edie.

Season 3
Karl appears only in the episode "Children and Art" to play the bad cop for Julie and Austin McCann, who have started dating. This backfires when he gets mad at Susan for dating Ian Hainsworth, a married English man whose wife is in a coma.

Season 4
Karl returns when Susan meets him at a Lamaze class as his pregnant new wife, Marissa (played by Sunny Mabrey), is there; Mike is not there as he was receiving his 30 days chip. Karl constantly teases Susan about how things are going for him including Marissa being an author and a law student and him becoming partner of his firm and he constantly puts Mike down for referring to him as "the plumber". Susan however brings Mike along to the next class and makes herself and him dress up in order to impress Karl, where they both lie and say they have a party to go to after and that Mike now owns his company. However Susan becomes disappointed when Mike mentions he was in rehab. When Susan confronts Karl, he tells her that Mike is a good guy and he'd be better for her then he ever would. In the five year time skip between seasons 4 and 5, it is presumed Karl and Marissa had their child.

Season 5
Karl reappears in the second episode, when Julie asks him to help her with her insurance. He mentions to Susan having awareness of her affair with painter Jackson Braddock, and teases her about her taste in men, prompting Susan to ask him to leave.

Karl reappears yet again in the eighteenth episode of the fifth season, "A Spark. To Pierce the Dark.". He has enrolled his son Evan in Susan's art class, where Susan gives them an art assignment to draw what makes them happy. Evan draws his mother being pierced with a sword. Susan, concerned, approaches Karl, and it turns out that Marissa has left them because she could not handle being a mother, leaving him to raise Evan by himself. The experience has led Karl to come to an understanding of why it bothers Susan to see him and understand the ramifications of his infidelities during his marriage to Susan. Susan sympathizes with him, as although she always wanted Karl to feel what he had done to her, she also regrets that it happened to him.

Bree later hires Karl as her divorce lawyer. When Bree's husband, Orson Hodge, blackmails her into staying in the marriage, Karl and Bree begin an affair.

Season 6
Karl and Bree continue their affair during the first part of the sixth season. Karl decides to propose to Bree during the annual Christmas party, even hiring an engine plane with a banner behind it with the message "Will you marry me, Bree? Love, Karl" to fly over Wisteria Lane. Karl shows up at the party and tells Orson about the proposal. The two men end up getting into a fight inside Santa's Workshop, which Bree tries unsuccessfully to defuse. The fight is brought to an end when the pilot of the plane Karl hired suffers a fatal heart attack at the controls, and subsequently crash-lands into the party, smashing straight into the workshop. As a result of the crash, Karl is killed while Orson is rendered paralyzed. Part of the following episode is devoted to Susan wondering what would have happened to her life if she had not divorced Karl, while another part centers on Bree contemplating a hypothetical marriage to Karl. In his will, Karl leaves Susan his partial ownership of a local strip club.

Season 8
Richard Burgi makes one last, uncredited appearance as Karl in the series finale, "Finishing the Hat", as one of the ghosts that watch Susan and her family leave Wisteria Lane.

References

Desperate Housewives characters
Fictional American lawyers
Television characters introduced in 2004

pl:Znajomi Susan Mayer#Karl Mayer